Lina Loh Woon Lee (born 1949), also known as Lina Chiam, is a Singaporean former politician. She was previously a Non-Constituency Member of Parliament between 2011 and 2015 and was the committee member of Singapore People's Party since 2019.

A former member of the opposition Singapore People's Party (SPP), she contested in the 2011 and 2015 generel election in Potong Pasir SMC, but lost to the governing People's Action Party's Sitoh Yih Pin in both elections.

Political career

2011 general election
Loh formally entered politics during the 2011 general election when she contested as a SPP candidate in Potong Pasir SMC. Loh ultimately lost to the PAP candidate Sitoh Yih Pin by a narrow margin of 114 votes (0.72%), garnering 49.64% of the vote against Sitoh's 50.36%.

Despite her electoral defeat as the best performing defeated candidate, Loh qualified for a seat in the 12th Parliament as a Non-constituency Member of Parliament (NCMP) by virtue of being one of the "best losers" in an election in which fewer than nine opposition Members of Parliament had been elected. She accepted the NCMP seat on 12 May 2011 and served in the 12th Parliament from 12 May 2011 to 23 August 2015.

2015 general election
During the 2015 general election, Loh contested under the SPP banner in Potong Pasir SMC, but lost to the PAP's Sitoh Yih Pin again, garnering 33.61% of the vote against Sitoh's 66.39%. Since there were six opposition Members of Parliament had been elected in the 2015 general election, only three NCMP seats would be offered. Loh's electoral result in Potong Pasir SMC was lower than that of the opposition candidates in Punggol East SMC, Fengshan SMC and East Coast GRC, so she was not offered a NCMP seat in the 13th Parliament.

2020 general election and after
Loh and Chiam did not contest in the 2020 general election due to Chiam's declining health, which had led to him stepping down from his position as the SPP's secretary-general on 16 October 2019. Loh remains a member of the SPP's central executive committee after stepping down as its chairwoman in 2019.

Charity work
On 9 March 2017, Loh and Chiam launched the Chiam See Tong Sports Fund at the Old Parliament House to help needy athletes achieve their sporting dreams. They are the co-patrons of the organisation, which is chaired by their daughter, Camilla Chiam.

Personal life
Loh came from a Hakka Chinese family in Sungai Besi, a suburb of the Malaysian capital Kuala Lumpur. She was trained as a nurse at the Royal London Hospital and had worked for two years as a nurse in Singapore. She quit her job as a nurse to help with administrative work at Chiam's law firm, Chiam & Co, which operated from 1976 to 2002.

Loh met Chiam in London in 1973. They married in Singapore in 1975 when Chiam was 40 and Loh was 26, and have a daughter, Camilla.

References

Living people
1949 births
Singapore People's Party politicians
Singaporean Christians
Singaporean people of Hakka descent
Singaporean Non-constituency Members of Parliament
Members of the Parliament of Singapore
Malaysian emigrants to Singapore
People who lost Malaysian citizenship
Naturalised citizens of Singapore
Singaporean women in politics